Epiphanius (died June 5, 535)  was the Ecumenical Patriarch of Constantinople from February 25, 520 to June 5, 535, succeeding John II Cappadocia.

Biography
The Byzantine Empire was now rising to great splendour through the victories of its generals, Belisarius and Narses. Idolatry was universally suppressed, pagan books were burnt and images destroyed, the professors of the old religion imprisoned and flogged. At Constantinople the zeal of Justinian I for a church policy was shown during the patriarchate of Epiphanius by laws (e.g. in 528 and 529) regulating episcopal elections and duties. These enactments, and the passivity of Epiphanius and his clergy, show the absence as yet for exclusively clerical legislation for the spirituality.

The first conspicuous office of Epiphanius was the charge of the catechumens at Constantinople. In 519, the year before his election, he was sent with John II and count Licinius to Macedonia to receive the documents "libellos," or subscriptions of those who wished reunion with the Catholic Church, at the request of the apocrisiarius of Dorotheus, bishop of Thessalonica.

On 25 February 520, he was elected bishop by the Byzantine Emperor Justin I, with the consent of bishops, monks, and people. He is described in the letter of the synod of Constantinople to Pope Hormisdas as "holding the right faith, and maintaining a fatherly care for orphans".

He accepted the conditions of peace between East and West concluded by his predecessor, Patriarch John II with Pope Hormisdas; ratifying them at a council at Constantinople, where he accepted also the decrees of Chalcedon. Dioscorus, agent of Hormisdas at Constantinople, writes of his fair promises, but adds, "What he can fulfil we don't know. He has not yet asked us to communion". Four letters remain of Epiphanius to Hormisdas, telling him of his election, sending him his creed, and declaring that he condemned all those whose name the pope had forbidden to be recited in the diptychs.

Epiphanius adopted the symbol of Nicaea, the decrees of Ephesus, Constantinople, and Chalcedon, and the letters of Pope Leo I in defence of the faith. His second letter was accompanied by a chalice of gold surrounded with precious stones, a patina of gold, a chalice of silver, and two veils of silk, which he presented to the Roman church. In order to make the peace general, he advised the pope not to be too rigorous in exacting the extrusion of the names of former bishops from diptychs. His excuse for the bishops of Pontus, Asia, and the East is composed in very beautiful language. The answers of Hormisdas are given in the Acts of the Council of Constantinople held under Mennas, in which he states his trust in the prudence and experience of Epiphanius, and recommends lenity towards the returning, severity to the obdurate. Epiphanius is to complete the reunion himself.

The severe measures by which Justin was establishing the supremacy of the Catholics in the East were arousing Theodoric the Great, the Ostrogothic and Arian master of Italy, to retaliation in the West. Pope John I, the successor of Hormisdas, became alarmed; and in 525, at the demand of Theodoric, proceeded to Constantinople to obtain the revocation of the edict against the Arians and get their churches restored to them (Marcellinus Comes).

Great honor was paid to pope John in the eastern capital. The people went out twelve miles to receive him, bearing ceremonial tapers and crosses. The emperor Justin prostrated himself before him, and wished to be crowned by his hand. The patriarch Epiphanius invited him to perform Mass; but the pope, mindful of the traditional policy of encroachment, refused to do so until they had offered him the first seat. With high solemnity he said the office in Latin on Easter Day, communicating with all the bishops of the East except Patriarch Timothy of Alexandria, the declared enemy of Chalcedon.

In 531 the dispute between Rome and Constantinople was revived by the appeal of Stephen, metropolitan of Larissa, to Pope Boniface II, against the sentence of Epiphanius. Stephen was eventually deposed, notwithstanding his appeal.

Epiphanius died after an episcopate of 14 years and 3 months. All that is known of him is to his advantage. Besides his letters to Hormisdas, we have the sentence of his council against Severus of Antioch and Peter Mongus. Forty-five canons are attributed to him.

References

Attribution

6th-century patriarchs of Constantinople
535 deaths
Christian anti-Gnosticism
Year of birth unknown
Justinian I
6th-century Byzantine writers